Kosmos 901 ( meaning Cosmos 901), also known as DS-P1-I No.18 was a satellite which was used as a radar target for anti-ballistic missile tests. It was launched by the Soviet Union in 1977 as part of the Dnepropetrovsk Sputnik programme.

It was launched aboard a Kosmos-2I 63SM rocket, from Site 133/1 at Plesetsk. The launch occurred at 10:30 UTC on 5 April 1977.

It decayed from orbit on 28 June 1978.

Kosmos 901 was the eighteenth of nineteen DS-P1-I satellites to be launched. Of these, all reached orbit successfully except the seventh.

See also

1977 in spaceflight

References

1977 in spaceflight
Kosmos satellites
Spacecraft launched in 1977
Dnepropetrovsk Sputnik program